Akamba is a genus of cicadas in the family Cicadidae. There is at least one described species in Akamba, A. aethiopica.

References

Further reading

 
 
 
 

Chlorocystini
Cicadidae genera